Together in Vegas is the fifth collaborative studio album by English singers Michael Ball and Alfie Boe. It was released on 28 October 2022 through Decca Records. The album peaked at number three on the UK Albums Chart.

Track listing

Charts

References

2022 albums
Alfie Boe albums
Decca Records albums
Michael Ball albums
Vocal duet albums